Marcus Pupienus Africanus Maximus (c. 200 – aft. 236 AD) was a Roman Senator.

Life
He was consul ordinarius in 236 as the colleague of emperor Maximinus I. Maximus was the son of Pupienus, later emperor, and Sextia Cethegilla.

He married Cornelia Marullina, born c. 205, daughter of Lucius Cornelius Cossonius Scipio Salvidius Orfitus and wife, and had two children: Pupiena Sextia Paulina Cethegilla, born c. 225 and named after her paternal aunt, who married Marcus Maecius Probus, and Publius Pupienus Maximus.

Family tree

References

 Christian Settipani. Continuité gentilice et continuité sénatoriale dans les familles sénatoriales romaines à l'époque impériale, 2000

Imperial Roman consuls
3rd-century Romans
200s births
Year of birth uncertain
Year of death unknown
Pupieni
Sons of Roman emperors